The 2020 Pittsburgh Panthers women's soccer team represented University of Pittsburgh during the 2020 NCAA Division I women's soccer season.  The Panthers are led by head coach Randy Waldrum, in his third season.  They play home games at Ambrose Urbanic Field.  This is the team's 25th season playing organized men's college soccer and their 8th playing in the Atlantic Coast Conference.

Due to the COVID-19 pandemic, the ACC played a reduced schedule in 2020 and the NCAA Tournament was postponed to 2021.  The ACC did not play a spring league schedule, but did allow teams to play non-conference games that would count toward their 2020 record in the lead up to the NCAA Tournament.

The Panthers finished the fall season 9–5–0, 3–5–0 in ACC play to finish in tenth place. They did not qualify for the ACC Tournament.  The team won both games of their extra spring season.  They were not invited to the NCAA Tournament.

Previous season 

The Panthers finished the season 5–10–3 overall, and 2–6–2 in ACC play to finish in tenth place.  They did not qualify for the ACC Tournament and were not invited to the NCAA Tournament.

Squad

Roster 

Updated February 25, 2021

Team management

Source:

Schedule

Source:

|-
!colspan=6 style=""| Fall Regular Season

|-
!colspan=6 style=""| Spring Regular season

Rankings

Fall 2020

Spring 2021

References

Pittsburgh
Pittsburgh Panthers women's soccer seasons
2020 in sports in Pennsylvania